A. P. Arjun (born 8 August 1984) is an Indian film director, screenwriter and lyricist. He works in Kannada cinema. He made his debut as a lyricist in the film Thangigagi (2006), he debuted as a director with the 2009 film Ambari. His second directorial Addhuri (2012) and won him multiple awards. In a recent press conference of movie Pogaru, he threatened to kidnap and assault a few reviewers who had pointed out his plagiarism and were critical of his movies

Personal life
Arjun married Annapoorna on 10 May 2020 in a simple ceremony with his close relatives. Ceremony done in simple traditional way in Arjun's home. Couple got blessed with baby boy who born on 6 may 2021.

Filmography

As director

As associate director
Shastri (2005)
Thangigagi (2006)
Snehana Preethina  (2007)

As lyricist
 Thangigagi (2006)
 Yuga (2007)
 Ambari (2009)
 Banni (2010)
 Gubbi  (2010)
 Swayamvara (2010)
 Sugreeva (2010)
 Addhuri (2012)
 Rajanikantha (2013)
 Varadhanayaka (2013)
 Chandra (2013)
 Andhar Bahar (2013)
 Aantharya (2013)
 Endendu Ninagagi (2014)
 Karodpathi (2014)
 Shivajinagara (2014)
 Bahaddur (2014)
 Tharagele (2014)
 Fair & Lovely (2014)
 Gajakesari (2014)
 Mr. and Mrs. Ramachari (2014)
 Rhaatee (2015)
 Endendigu (2015)
 Muddu Manase (2015)

References

External links 

Film directors from Karnataka
Kannada film directors
Kannada-language lyricists
Indian lyricists
Living people
1972 births
Filmfare Awards South winners
People from Mandya
21st-century Indian film directors